In New York is an album by Hindustani classical musician Ravi Shankar. It was released in 1968 on vinyl. It was later digitally remastered and released in CD format through Angel Records.

Track listing
"Raga Bairagi" – 5:37
"Nata Bhairavi" – 15:16
"Raga Marwa" – 25:12

External links
Amazon.com listing

1968 albums
Ravi Shankar albums
Angel Records albums